(Now that the daylight fills the sky), WAB 18, is a motet composed by Anton Bruckner in 1868. The work is also known as In S. Angelum custodem (In the custody of the holy angel). Bruckner revised the composition in 1886.

History 
Bruckner dedicated it to Adolf Dorfer, the abbot of the abbey. Bruckner set the music on the text written by Robert Riepl, one of the priests working at the abbey. The motet was performed in the same year in the abbey.

Riepl's text is an adaptation of the text used by Orlande de Lassus. Bruckner's original manuscript, which was stored in the abbey, is lost. A copy of it is stored in the archive of the Kremsmünster Abbey and two other copies are found in the Austrian National Library. The motet was published in 1868 by the Wilhering Abbey.

In 1886, Bruckner made a new version of the motet for men's choir, which was published in the journal , volume 1, no. 8, p. 240, F. Mamroth, Vienna.

The  includes two settings of the 1868 version in volume XXI/24, and the 1886 setting in volume XXI/35.

Music 
The first version in Phrygian mode, which Bruckner composed in 1868, is 24-bar long. Two settings are extant: a first with all eight verses of Riepl's text for  choir a cappella, and a second with only one verse of a different text for  choir and organ. The motet is a simple, modally inspired piece and homophonic throughout.

A new version of the motet in G minor, which Bruckner composed in 1886, is one bar shorter (23-bar long). It uses verses 1, 2, 7 and 8 of Riepl's text and is set for  choir  a cappella.

Text of the first setting (Robert Riepl) 
{|
|
|style="padding-left:2em;"|Now that daylight fills the sky,
Let it, O Guardian Angel,
Banish unclear minds 
And bring the nourishing light!
Teach me prudently the correct order
And admonish me to reach it!

Reliably you come from Heaven
And return as a messenger to it.
Bring the offers, pains and tears
To the King's court;
Provide the Giver of talents
With a small gift from the servant!

Foster me, the unfortunate, embracing
With the sweetest consolation!
Prompt me, the dormant,
To the works of salvation!
Blame me, when I hesitate,
Give me the strength, when I fall!

Radiant of the pure light,
Which floods out from God,
I am in search of holiness.
Deliver me from stain,
So that the white lilies of chastity
Be not sullied.

By your powerful right repel
The powers of the Devil to Hell;
Destroy the pleasure of the flesh,
Which arises from pride,
So that, protected by your arms,
I may be victorious.

Break the inflexible obstinacy
Of the merciless heart;
I am oppressed by the burden of sin,
Relieve it by your powerful hand
And spare me the punishment of the guilty
By your prayers.

In storms let hurry the times
The temporal life will assault!
Let me disdain the ephemeral
And always seek the eternal,
So that my noble soul
Would remain in Heaven.

When mortal struggle is imminent,
Assist me, quavering, firmly!
Guide me through the shades of death,
Advocate me in front of the Judge
And on grounds of the acquittal
Might I enjoy the eternal splendour! Amen.
|}

Text of the second setting 
{|
|
|style="padding-left:2em;"|Now that the daylight fills the sky,
My holy angel,
By your brightness
Draw the darkness from my soul;
Teach me the right way
And advise me to follow it.
|}

Selected discography 
The first recording occurred in 1976:
 Mathias Breitschaft, Limburger Domsingknaben, Bruckner: 9 Motets/Palestrina: 8 Motets – LP: Carus FSM 53118 (1st verse of the 1st setting)

1868 version

First setting 
A few other recordings, all with deviations from the score:
 Balduin Sulzer, Chor des Musikgymnasiums Linz, Musik aus der Stifterstraße – LP: Extempore AD-80.01/2, 1980 (verses 1, 2 & 3)
 Robert Jones, Choir of St. Bride's Church, Bruckner: Motets – CD: Naxos 8.550956, 1994 (all 8 verses)
 Lionel Sow, Choeur de Filles Caecilia & Maîtrise des Petits Chanteurs de Saint-Christophe de Javel, Johannes Brahms – Anton Bruckner Jardins secrets – CD: Studio SM Collection Blanche D3029, 2004 (verses 1, 2 & 3)

Second setting 
Only one recording :
 Balduin Sulzer, Mozart Chor Linz, Bruckner – CD: AtemMusik Records ATMU 97001, 1997 (with brass accompaniment)

1886 version 
There are two recordings of this version:
 Duncan Ferguson, Choir of St. Mary's Cathedral of Edinburgh, Bruckner: Motets  – CD: Delphian Records DCD34071, 2010
 Matthias Giesen, Schola Floriana, Kirchenmusik im Bruckner-Ort Ansfelden – CD: Weinberg Records SW 010497-2, 2016 (strophes 1 & 2)

References

Sources 
 Anton Bruckner – Sämtliche Werke, Band XXI: Kleine Kirchenmusikwerke, Musikwissenschaftlicher Verlag der Internationalen Bruckner-Gesellschaft, Hans Bauernfeind and Leopold Nowak (Editor), Vienna, 1984/2001
 Cornelis van Zwol, Anton Bruckner 1824–1896 – Leven en werken, uitg. Thoth, Bussum, Netherlands, 2012. 
 Crawford Howie, Anton Bruckner – A documentary biography, online revised edition

External links 
 
  - 2nd setting
 In S. Angelum custodem, WAB 18 Critical discography by Hans Roelofs  
 Iam lucis, a live performance of the third setting of the motet by Der junge Chor der Liederblüte of Oberweyer (2015), on YouTube

Motets by Anton Bruckner
1868 compositions
1886 compositions
Compositions in G minor